Cermenate is a comune (municipality) in the Province of Como in the Italian region Lombardy, located about  north of Milan and about  south of Como. 

Cermenate borders the following municipalities: Bregnano, Cantù, Carimate, Lazzate, Lentate sul Seveso, Vertemate con Minoprio.

Cermenate is served by Cantù-Cermenate railway station.

Among the churches are San Vito e Modesto.

References

External links
 Official website

Cities and towns in Lombardy